The London Film Critics Circle Award for British/Irish Actor of the Year in an annual award given by the London Film Critics Circle.

Winners

1990s

2000s

2010s

2020s

Film awards for lead actor
A